is a district in Tokyo, and a part of the Minato ward.

Education
Minato City Board of Education operates public elementary and junior high schools. Moto-Akasaka (1-2-chōme) is zoned to Akasaka Elementary School (赤坂小学校) and Akasaka Junior High School (赤坂中学校).

References

Akasaka, Tokyo
Districts of Minato, Tokyo